Guy Maganga Gorra (born 18 March 1993) is a Gabonese sprinter. He finished fourth in the 200 metres at the 2019 African Games. He was selected for the 2019 World Championships in Doha as well as the 2020 Summer Games.

He holds the national records in the 200 metres, both indoors and outdoors.

He was part of Gabon's team at the 2020 Summer Olympics together with sibling swimmers Adam and Aya Girard de Langlade Mpali.

International competitions

Personal bests
Outdoor
100 metres – 10.30 (+1.5 m/s, Lynchburg 2019)
200 metres – 20.44 (+1.0 m/s, Eugene 2022) NR
400 metres – 46.60 (High Point 2021)

Indoor
60 metres – 6.84 (Nantes 2019)
200 metres – 21.02 (Lynchburg 2021) NR

References

1993 births
Living people
Gabonese male sprinters
Athletes (track and field) at the 2019 African Games
Athletes (track and field) at the 2020 Summer Olympics
African Games competitors for Gabon
Olympic athletes of Gabon
21st-century Gabonese people